George Fonder (June 22, 1917 Elmhurst, Pennsylvania – June 14, 1958 Hatfield, Pennsylvania) was an American racecar driver. He made four Championship Car starts, including two in the Indianapolis 500 and drove as a relief driver in the 1954 Indianapolis 500 for two different teams after failing to qualify his own car. His best Champ Car finish was in the October 1949 race at Langhorne Speedway. He was killed in a midget-car racing accident.

Indy 500 results

* Shared drive with Len Duncan
** Shared drive with Frank Armi

World Championship career summary
The Indianapolis 500 was part of the FIA World Championshipfrom 1950 through 1960. Drivers competing at Indy during those years were credited with World Championship points and participation. George Fonder participated in 2 World Championship races. He started on the pole 0 times, won 0 races, set 0 fastest laps, and finished on the podium 0 times. He accumulated a total of 0 championship points.

1917 births
1958 deaths
Indianapolis 500 drivers
Racing drivers who died while racing
Sports deaths in Pennsylvania
People from Lackawanna County, Pennsylvania
Racing drivers from Pennsylvania